The Constitution of Guyana provides for freedom of religion, and the Government generally respects this right in practice, except in schools where Christianity is the only religion being practiced; children are asked to recite Christian prayers at least four times per day. The U.S. government could locate no reports of societal abuses or discrimination based on religious belief or practice during 2007 because it ignores the situation in public schools.

Religious demography

Data from a 2002 census on religious affiliation indicates that approximately 57 percent of the population is Christian: 17 percent Pentecostal, 8 percent Roman Catholic, 7 percent Anglican, 5 percent Seventh-day Adventist, and 20 percent other Christian groups. Approximately 28 percent is Hindu, 7 percent is Muslim (mostly Sunni), and 2 percent practice other beliefs, including the Rastafari movement and the Baháʼí Faith. An estimated 4 percent of the population does not profess any religion.

The country is ethnically diverse, reflecting East Indian, African, Chinese, and European ancestry, as well as a significant indigenous population. Members of all ethnic groups are well represented in all religious groups, with two exceptions: most Hindus are Indo-Guyanese, and nearly all Rastafarians are Afro-Guyanese. Foreign missionaries from many religious groups are present.

Status of religious freedom

Legal/policy framework

The Constitution provides for freedom of religion, and the Government generally respected this right in practice. The Government at all levels sought to protect this right in full and did not tolerate its abuse, either by governmental or private actors.

The law protects the right of individuals to choose and change their religion and to interpret their religious beliefs for themselves. Members of all religious groups worshiped freely. There is no state or otherwise dominant religion, and the Government practiced no form of religious favoritism or discrimination except for public schools, where Christianity is the only religion practice, school children are ask to recite Christian prayers throughout the day.

While the Government recognizes religious groups of all faiths, they must register with the Government to receive formal recognition. Religious groups seeking to establish operations must first obtain permission from the Ministry of Home Affairs. In the past, access to Amerindian areas required permission from the Ministry of Amerindian Affairs and the Ministry of Home Affairs; however, under the 2006 revision of the Amerindian Act only the permission of the local Village Council is required. There is no formal monitoring of religious groups.

The following holy days are national holidays: Christian-Good Friday, Easter, and Christmas; Hindu-Phagwah (festival welcoming spring) and Diwali (festival of lights); Islamic-You-Man-Nabi (birth of the Prophet Muhammad) and Eid Al-Adha (feast of sacrifice).

Both public and religiously affiliated schools exist, and parents are free to send their children to the school of their choice without sanction or restriction, except the AFC-ANUP administration has imposed an 18% VAT/tax on students that choose to attend private school. The Government imposes no requirements regarding religion for any official or nonofficial purposes.

Restrictions on religious freedom

Government policy and practice contributed to the generally free practice of religion.

The Guyana Defense Force (GDF) makes an effort to coordinate with civilian religious groups to provide personnel with access to religious services. Leaders of all major religious groups provided prayer and counseling, although generally only Christian sermons were given on GDF bases. Although no official GDF policy requires attendance at religious services, anecdotal evidence from GDF officers suggests that individual commanders required attendance at some religious programs. Membership in a particular religion did not confer any advantage or disadvantage; however, general military practice tended to be biased in favor of Christians.

There were no reports of religious prisoners or detainees in the country or of forced religious conversion.

Societal abuses and discrimination

There were no reports of societal abuses or discrimination based on religious belief or practice.

Promoting peace/Supporting harmony
The Inter-Religious Organization (IRO), a nongovernmental umbrella organization for Christian, Hindu, Islamic, and Baháʼí organizations, held events to promote peace during the August 2006 election. The IRO's role in supporting harmony among religious groups was largely supplanted by the Ethnic Relations Commission, a government-constituted body.

The Church of Jesus Christ of Latter-day Saints
In September 2009, forty mainly U.S. citizen missionaries from the Church of Jesus Christ of Latter-day Saints were detained briefly. Subsequently, the 100+ missionaries were ordered to leave the country within a month. In addition to its missionary work, The Church of Jesus Christ of Latter-day Saints owns approximately $2 million in property in Guyana. Missionaries have worked in the country for more than 20 years.

References

Human rights in Guyana
Religion in Guyana